Dunajská Streda District (Slovak: Okres Dunajská Streda, Hungarian: Dunaszerdahelyi járás) is a district in the Trnava Region of western Slovakia. 
Until 1918, the district was mostly part of the county of Kingdom of Hungary of Pozsony, apart from a small area in the south,
which formed part of the county of Komárno, and Baloň, which formed part of the county of Győr. The majority of the inhabitants of Dunajská Streda District are Hungarians.

Municipalities

References

External links 
 Dunajská Streda

 
Districts of Slovakia
Hungarian-speaking countries and territories